The Hereford is a British breed of beef cattle originally from Herefordshire in the West Midlands of England. It has spread to many countries – there are more than five million purebred Hereford cattle in over fifty nations worldwide. The breed was first exported from Britain in 1817, initially to Kentucky. It spread across the United States and Canada, through Mexico, to the great beef-raising countries of South America. Today Herefords dominate from Australasia to the Russian steppes, including Israel, Japan, continental Europe and Scandinavia, temperate parts of Australia, Canada, the United States, Kazakhstan and Russia, the centre and east of Argentina, Uruguay, Chile, and New Zealand, where they make up the largest proportion of registered cattle. They are found all over Brazil and in some Southern African countries, notably South Africa, Zambia and Zimbabwe. 

Their original popularity among ranchers of the American Southwest testified to the hardiness of a breed originating in cool, moist Britain, but shown to thrive in harsher climates on nearly every continent. The World Hereford Council, is based in Britain. There are currently 20 Hereford societies in 17 member-countries and a further eight in 10 non-member countries. In the United States, the official Hereford organization and breed registry is the American Hereford Association, the second-largest society of its kind in the country.

History

Until the 18th century, the cattle of Herefordshire resembled other cattle of southern England, being wholly red with a white switch, similar to the modern North Devon and Sussex breeds. In the 18th and early 19th centuries, other cattle (mainly Shorthorns) were used to create a new type of draught and beef cattle which at first varied in colour, with herds ranging from yellow to grey and light brown, and with varying amounts of white. By the end of the 18th century the white face characteristic of the modern breed was well established, as was the modern colour during the 19th century.

The Hereford is still seen in the Herefordshire countryside today and featured strongly at agricultural shows. The first imports of Herefords to the United States were made about 1817 by the politician Henry Clay, with larger importation beginning in the 1840s.

Polled Hereford

The Polled Hereford is a hornless variant of Hereford with a polled gene, a natural genetic mutation selected into a separate breed from 1889.

Iowa cattle rancher Warren Gammon capitalised on the idea of breeding Polled Herefords and started the registry with 11 naturally polled cattle. The American Polled Hereford Association (APHA) was formed in 1910. The American Polled Hereford and American Hereford breeds have been combined since 1995 under the same American Hereford Association name.

In Australia the breed is known as the Poll Hereford.

Traditional Hereford

Many strains of Hereford have used other cattle breeds to import desired characteristics, which has led to changes in the breed as a whole. However, some strains have been kept separate and retained characteristics of the earlier breed, such as hardiness and thriftiness. The Traditional Hereford is now treated as a minority breed of value for genetic conservation.

Health

Eye cancer (ocular squamous cell carcinoma) occurs in Herefords, notably in countries with continued bright sunlight and among those that prefer traits of low levels of red pigmentation round the eye. Studies of eye cancer in Hereford cattle in the US and Canada showed lid and corneoscleral pigment to be heritable and likely to decrease the risk of cancer. Vaginal prolapse is considered a heritable problem, but may also be influenced by nutrition. Another problem is exposed skin on the udder being of light pigmentation and so vulnerable to sunburn.

Dwarfism is known to occur in Hereford cattle, caused by an autosomal recessive gene. Equal occurrence in heifers and bulls means that dwarfism is not considered a sex-linked characteristic.

See also
Black Hereford (breed)
Hereford United F.C.
Hereford pig
List of cattle breeds

References

External links

World Hereford Council
American Hereford Association
Australian Hereford Society
Canadian Hereford Association
Irish Hereford Breed Society
New Zealand Hereford Association
List of US State/National Hereford Associations
List of Other International Hereford Associations
Polled Hereford Breed Information - Cattle.com
The Origin and Growth of Polled Herefords - Oklahoma State University
Romanian Hereford cattle Society

Beef cattle breeds
Cattle breeds originating in England
Animal breeds on the RBST Watchlist
Herefordshire